Strange Life of Ivan Osokin is a 1915 novel by P. D. Ouspensky.  It follows the unsuccessful struggle of Ivan Osokin to correct his mistakes when given a chance to relive his past.  The novel serves as a narrative platform for Nietzsche's theory of eternal recurrence. The conclusion fully anticipates the Fourth Way Philosophy which typified Ouspensky's later works. In particular the final chapter's description of the shocking realization of the mechanical nature of existence, its consequences, and the possibility/responsibility of working in an esoteric school.

Plot summary
When the protagonist realizes that he can recall having lived his life before, he decides to try to change it. But he discovers that, because human choices tend to be mechanical, changing the outcome of one's actions is extremely difficult. He realizes that without help breaking his mechanical behavior, he may be doomed to repeat the same mistakes forever.

Characters
 Ivan Osokin, the main character of the novel
 The Magician, a minor but important character who makes appearances at the beginning and the end of the novel. A possible reference to Ouspensky's teacher, George Gurdjieff.

Literary significance and reception
Harold Ramis, who directed Groundhog Day, found the meaning of Strange Life of Ivan Osokin similar to the existential dilemma of Groundhog Day.  Both works imply that a sober acceptance of personal accountability is necessary in order to effect an increase in the degree of freedom of the individual.  Ramis' opinion is printed in the Lindisfarne Books' 2004 edition of Strange Life of Ivan Osokin.

A character of the 2022 anime Summer Time Rendering refers to the novel to help explain that story's time loop plot.

Publication history
WorldCat lists 12 editions of the novel.

 1915, First Edition, Russia, publisher, Pub date ?? ??? 1915
 1947, Limited Edition (356 copies), UK, Stourton Press, Pub date ?? Oct 1947
 1948, First Edition, UK, Faber & Faber, Pub date ?? ??? 1948, Hardback
 1947, Lindisfarne Books, US,   Paperback

References

External links
Strange Life of Ivan Osokin at Gurdjieff International Review.
 Synopsis Time online, November 17, 1947
Strange Life of Ivan Osokin Excerpts at Google Books

1915 Russian novels
Books by P. D. Ouspensky